In the anatomy of an embryo, the splanchnopleuric mesenchyme  is a structure created during embryogenesis when the lateral mesodermal germ layer splits into two layers. The inner (or splanchnic) layer adheres to the endoderm, and with it forms the splanchnopleure (mesoderm external to the coelom plus the endoderm).

See also
Post development the somato and splanchnopleuric junction lies at the duodeno-jejunal flexure.
 somatopleure
 mesenchyme

References

External links
 
 
 Overview at Kennesaw State University

Embryology